George Charles "Rabbit" Nill (July 14, 1881 – May 24, 1962) was a Major League Baseball second baseman who played for five seasons. He played for the Washington Senators from 1904 to 1907 and the Cleveland Naps from 1907 to 1908.

External links

1881 births
1962 deaths
Major League Baseball second basemen
Washington Senators (1901–1960) players
Cleveland Naps players
Anderson (minor league baseball) players
Davenport River Rats players
Marion Glass Blowers players
Colorado Springs Millionaires players
New Orleans Pelicans (baseball) players
Toledo Mud Hens players
Wilkes-Barre Barons (baseball) players
Providence Grays (minor league) players
Chattanooga Lookouts players
Seattle Giants players
Tacoma Tigers players
Baseball players from Fort Wayne, Indiana